Borja García may refer to:

Borja García (racing driver) (born 1982), Spanish racing driver
Borja García (footballer, born January 1990), Spanish football attacking midfielder
Borja García (footballer, born November 1990), Spanish football defender